The Dallas–Fort Worth Film Critics Association (DFWFCA) is an organization of 31 print, radio/TV and internet journalists from Dallas–Fort Worth-based publications. Current members include Robert Wilonsky and Chris Vognar of The Dallas Morning News, Denton Record-Chronicle's Preston Barta, Film Threat's Chase Whale, Twitch Film's Peter Martin, and Peter Simek of D Magazine. In December of each year, the DFWFCA meets to vote on their Dallas–Fort Worth Film Critics Association Awards for films released in the same calendar year.

In December 2006, the Miami Herald described the association as "one of the most reliable bellwethers of the Academy Award for Best Picture."

Members

 Frank Swietek – Founder
 Todd Jorgenson – President
 Arnold Wayne Jones – Vice President
 Ally Adnan
 Boo Allen
 Preston Barta
 Juanita L. Brown
 Stephen Becker
 PC Chambers
 Scott Churchill
 Nancy Churnin
 Cary Darling
 Gary Dowell
 Julie Fisk
 Candace Havens
 Laura Hiros
 Jo Ann Holt
 Cynthia A. Jordan
 Kristian Lin
 Peter Martin
 Matt Mungle
 Britton Peele
 Alice Reese
 Gwen Reyes
 Rubin Safaya
 Paul Salfen
 Ronald P. Salfen
 Peter Simek
 Chris Vognar
 Mark Walters
 Chase Whale
 Frank Wilkins
 Robert Wilonsky

Award categories

 Best Film
 Top 10 Films of the Year
 Best Director
 Best Actor
 Best Actress
 Best Supporting Actor
 Best Supporting Actress
 Best Screenplay
 Best Cinematography
 Best Musical Score
 Best Foreign Language Film
 Best Animated Film
 Best Documentary Film (2002–)
 Russell Smith Award

Award breakdown
(2 awards and more)
 5 awards:
 Birdman (2014): Best Picture, Actor, Director, Cinematography, and Screenplay
 Lincoln (2012): Best Picture, Actor, Supporting Actor, Supporting Actress, and Musical Score
 The Descendants (2011): Best Picture, Actor, Supporting Actress, Director, and Screenplay
 4 awards:
Moonlight (2016): Best Picture, Director, Supporting Actor, and Russell Smith Award
 The Revenant (2015): Best Actor, Director, Cinematography, and Musical Score
 Up in the Air (2009): Best Picture, Director, Actor, and Screenplay
 Brokeback Mountain (2005): Best Film, Director, Adapted Screenplay and Cinematography
 Sideways (2004): Best Actor, Supporting Actor, Supporting Actress and Adapted Screenplay
 Leaving Las Vegas (1995): Best Film, Actor, Actress and Director
 1917 (2019): Best Picture, Director, Cinematography, and Musical Score
Marriage Story (2019): Best Actor, Actress, Supporting Actress and Screenplay
 3 awards:
Everything Everywhere All At Once (2022): Best Picture, Best Director, Best Supporting Actor
Nomadland (2020): Best Picture, Director, and Cinematography
 Roma (2018): Best Director, Foreign Film, and Cinematography
 12 Years a Slave (2013): Best Picture, Screenplay, and Supporting Actress
 Gravity (2013): Best Director, Cinematography, and Musical Score
 Zero Dark Thirty (2012): Best Actress, Director, and Screenplay
 The Social Network (2010): Best Picture, Director, and Screenplay
 No Country for Old Men (2007): Best Film, Supporting Actor and Director
 The Lord of the Rings: The Return of the King (2003): Best Film, Director and Cinematography
 A Beautiful Mind (2001): Best Film, Actor and Director
 American Beauty (1999): Best Film, Actor and Director
 Schindler's List (1993): Best Film, Supporting Actor and Director
 2 awards:
 Promising Young Woman (2020): Best Actress and Screenplay
 Mank (2020): Best Supporting Actress and Musical Score
 La La Land (2016): Best Cinematography and Musical Score
 Manchester by the Sea (2016): Best Actor and Screenplay
 Spotlight (2015): Best Picture and Screenplay
 Boyhood (2014): Best Supporting Actress and Russell Smith Award
 Dallas Buyers Club (2013): Best Actor and Supporting Actor
 127 Hours (2010): Best Actor and Cinematography
 The Fighter (2010): Best Supporting Actor and Supporting Actress
 The Dark Knight (2008): Best Cinematography and Supporting Actor
 Slumdog Millionaire (2008): Best Director and Film
 Capote (2005): Best Actor and Supporting Actress
 Million Dollar Baby (2004): Best Film and Actress
 About Schmidt (2002): Best Actor and Supporting Actress
 Far from Heaven (2002): Best Actress and Cinematography
 In the Bedroom (2001): Best Actress and Supporting Actress
 Crouching Tiger, Hidden Dragon (2000): Best Foreign Film and Cinematography
 You Can Count on Me (2000): Best Actress and Russell Smith Award
 Traffic (2000): Best Picture and Director
 The Wings of the Dove (1997): Best Actress and Supporting Actress

See also
 List of film awards

References

External links
 Official Dallas–Fort Worth Critics Association website

 
American film critics associations
Cinema of Texas
Culture of Dallas
Culture of Fort Worth, Texas
Mass media in the Dallas–Fort Worth metroplex
Organizations based in Dallas
Organizations based in Fort Worth, Texas
Organizations established in 1990
1990 establishments in Texas